A. Baluchamy (died 8 February 2012) was an Indian politician and former Member of the Legislative Assembly of Tamil Nadu. He was elected to the Tamil Nadu legislative assembly as an Anna Dravida Munnetra Kazhagam candidate from Nilakottai constituency in 1977, and 1984 elections and from Samayanallur constituency in 1980 election.

This article is about the AIADMK MLA for three consecutive years during the Founder M. G. Ramachandran era.

Early life and background 
Born 25 September 1941 as the first son to Alagumalai and Vellaiammal. Born in Sholavandan Panchayat town in Madurai District, is a beautiful village on the river bed of Vaigai River, during the Sangam period, the town belonged to Pandya Kingdom. There is a popular local myth, that a war between Chola and the Pandya kingdoms, resulted in the name. The invading Chola king, apparently got a sense of reverence and awe, seeing the intensive agriculture and scenic beauty of the village, irrigated by the Vaigai river; which reminded him of the Cauvery Delta region. He abandoned the war. The town was then named as Cholavandan [Cholan+Vandan]. Uvandan means getting awed, in Tamil. Legend has it that the invading king found the village and its flourishing agriculture cultivation, even more agriculturally prosperous then the historically famous  Tanjore villages: and called this town as "Chinna Tanjai"(Tamil: சின்ன தஞ்சை).  

Early education was Pre-University Course (PUC) and following the foot steps of family he was a successful farmer taking care of Rice, Mango and Banana Farms. So as his most of the activities was around the farm and nearby villages at times driving his cattle cart to vathalagundu santhai for selling his harvest from the Banana plantation. During one of his trip he found there was selection for army and joined army, he worked for a period of less than 5 years as wireless operator and fought in the battles during 1960's. After his exit from the Army he followed the footsteps of his leader and Idol M. G. Ramachandran All India Anna Dravida Munnetra Kazhagam (AIADMK).

Political career 
A. Baluchamy was a member of the All India Anna Dravida Munnetra Kazhagam (AIADMK), he used to wear the Khadi. He was elected as a member of Tamil Nadu legislative assembly for 

 Nilakottai constituency in 1977
 Samayanallur constituency in 1980
 Nilakottai constituency in 1984

References 

All India Anna Dravida Munnetra Kazhagam politicians
Living people
Year of birth missing (living people)

Tamil Nadu MLAs 1985–1989